Belgium competed at the 1996 Summer Olympics in Atlanta, United States.

Medalists

Archery

Veteran Paul Vermeiren was once again the only Belgian archer to compete in the nation's seventh appearance in the modern Olympic archery tournament.  He advanced all the way to the semifinals before being defeated.  In the bronze medal match, he was again defeated to finish with fourth place.

Athletics

Men
Track and road events

Women
Track and road events

Cycling

Mountain biking

Road

Men

Women

Track

Equestrian

Jumping

Gymnastics

Sailing

Shooting

Men

Women

Swimming

Men

Women

Tennis

Wrestling

Men's Greco-Roman

References

Digital Archive from the LA84 Foundation of Los Angeles 
Sports-reference

Nations at the 1996 Summer Olympics
1996
Olympic